Kuprevičius is a Lithuanian language family name. The surname corresponds to Polish "Kuprewicz" and East Slavic "Kuprevich".

The surname may refer to:

Giedrius Kuprevičius (born 1944),  Lithuanian composer, music educator
 (1901–1992), Lithuanian composer, music educator
 (1864–1932), Lithuanian doctor

Lithuanian-language surnames